Stenanthemum argenteum is a species of flowering plant in the family Rhamnaceae and is endemic to a restricted part of Queensland. It is a shrub with hairy branches, lance-shaped to egg-shaped leaves with the narrower end towards the base, and heads of about seven hairy white, tube-shaped flowers.

Description
The upper surface of the leaves is glabrous and the lower surface is densely covered with silvery hairs pressed against the surface. The petals are white, form a hood over the stamens and protrude  beyond the sepal tube. Flowering has been observed in May and September.

Taxonomy and naming
Stenanthemum argenteum was first formally described in 2004 by Anthony Bean in the journal Austrobaileya from specimens collected on Mount Mulligan in 1985. The specific epithet (argenteum) means "silvery", referring to the hairs on the branchlets and leaves.

Distribution and habitat
This species grows steep sandstone hills and cliffs in woodland and is only known from Mount Mulligan and Mount Janet in north Queensland.

Conservation status
Stenanthemum argenteum is listed as "vulnerable" under the Queensland Government Nature Conservation Act 1992.

References

argenteum
Rosales of Australia
Flora of Queensland
Plants described in 2004
Taxa named by Anthony Bean